Lalgudi Gopala Jayaraman (17 September 1930 – 22 April 2013) was an Indian Carnatic violinist, vocalist and composer. He is commonly grouped with M.S. Gopalakrishnan and T.N.Krishnan as part of the violin-trinity of Carnatic Music. He was awarded Padma Bhushan by the Government of India in 2001.

His disciples included his two children Lalgudi G. J. R. Krishnan, Lalgudi Vijayalakshmi, his sister Lalgudi Srimathi Brahmanandam, renowned musician S P Ramh (grandson of Shri. G.N. Dandapani Iyer), musician P. Purnachander Rao, renowned Harikatha exponent Vishaka Hari, leading carnatic vocalist Saketharaman, Vittal Ramamurthy, Dr. N. Shashidhar, Film Music Composer Girishh G, Padma Shankar, Kanchan Chandran, Raghuram Hosahalli, Srinivasamurthy, Pakkala Ramdas, Sankari Krishnan, Yamini Ramesh, Mumbai Shilpa, Shreya Devnath, Krithika Natarajan, Salem Sisters, the leading Vainika Srikanth Chary and the Academy Award-nominated Bombay Jayashri Ramnath.

Early life and background
Born in the lineage of a disciple of the musician Thyagaraja, Lalgudi Jayaraman inherited the essence of Carnatic music from his father, V. R. Gopala Iyer, who trained him. Gopala Iyer, a martinet, enforced traits of intense focus and discipline in the young Jayaraman through rigorous lessons. Though a harsh father and guru, Gopala Iyer would not allow the young Jayaraman to even sharpen pencils, believing that his tender fingers were too precious.

Career
At the age of 12, he started his musical career as an accompanying violinist to Carnatic musicians before rising as a prominent soloist.

He expanded the style of violin playing by inventing a new technique that is designed to suit the needs of Indian Classical Music and establishing a unique style that came to be known as Lalgudi Bani. Jayaraman composed several 'kritis', 'tillanas' and 'varnams' and dance compositions, which are a blend of raga, bhava, rhythm and lyrical beauty. Lalgudi's instrumental talent comes to the fore in the form of lyrical excellence. He brought vocal style into violin, and his renditions exhibit knowledge of lyrical content of the compositions. Lalgudi actively and scientifically learned to self-critique his performances and dutifully wrote detailed reviews after each concert, a habit encouraged by his father and guru. He was loath to experiment on stage in his solo concerts and almost always planned to the last detail, leading a certain critic to tout them as being intellectual rather than emotional in spirit, but Lalgudi's spontaneity and innate musical genius were often seen when he accompanied leading vocalists.

He was always in great demand for accompanying vocalists, and has accompanied vocal virtuosos including Ariyakudi Ramanuja Iyengar, Chembai Vaidyanatha Bhagavatar, M. D. Ramanathan, Semmangudi Srinivasa Iyer, G. N. Balasubramaniam, Madurai Mani Iyer, Alathur brothers, Voleti Venkateswarulu, Nedunuri Krishnamurthy, K. V. Narayanaswamy, Maharajapuram Santhanam, D. K. Jayaraman, M.Balamuralikrishna, T. V. Sankaranarayanan, T. N. Seshagopalan and flute maestro N. Ramani. He was forbidden from accompanying female artistes by his father, a promise that he kept. He has given concerts extensively in India as well as abroad. The Government of India sent him to Russia as a member of the Indian Cultural Delegation.

He was the first to bring international attention to the Carnatic style of violin playing. He also introduced a new concept of musical ensemble with violin, venu (flute) and veena in 1966.

After inviting him to play the Edinburgh Festival in 1965, Yehudi Menuhin, the renowned violinist, impressed by Lalgudi's technique and performance, presented him with his Italian violin. Lalgudi presented Menuhin with an ivory dancing Nataraja when Menuhin visited India.

He has also performed in Singapore, Malaysia, Manila and East European countries. His recordings submitted to the International Music Council, Baghdad, Asian Pacific Music Rostrum and Iraq Broadcasting Agency by AIR New Delhi have been adjudged as the best and accorded the first position out of 77 entries received from the various countries during 1979. He was invited to give concerts at Cologne, Belgium and France. The Government of India chose him to represent India at the Festival of India in USA, London and he gave solo and 'Jugalbandi' concerts in London and also in Germany and Italy that received rave reviews. Sri Lalgudi went on a tour in the year 1984 to Oman, UAE, Qatar and Bahrain, which was highly successful. He composed the lyrics and music for the operatic ballet Jaya Jaya Devi, which premiered in 1994 at Cleveland, Ohio (US) and was staged in many other cities in the United States. In October 1999, Lalgudi performed in the UK under the auspices of Sruthi Laya Sangham (Institute of fine arts). After the concert, a dance drama Pancheswaram, composed by Lalgudi, was staged.

His biography, An Incurable Romantic, by Lakshmi Devnath, was released posthumously in 2013. It contains a foreword by sitarist Ravi Shankar, and charts his 70 years in the music industry.

Awards

Jayaraman earned several titles, such as 'Nada Vidya Tilaka' by Music Lovers’ Association of Lalgudi in 1963, 'Padma Shri' by the Government of India in 1972, 'Nada Vidya Rathnakara' by East West Exchange in New York, 'Vadya Sangeetha Kalaratna' by Bharathi Society, New York; 'Sangeetha Choodamani' by Sri Krishna Gana Sabha, Chennai in 1971; State Vidwan of Tamil Nadu by the Government of Tamil Nadu and Sangeetha Natak Academy award in 1979 etc. The First Chowdaiah Memorial National-Level award was given to Sri Jayaraman by the Chief Minister of Karnataka. He also received honorary citizenship of Maryland, US in 1994 and the Padma Bhushan by the Government of India in 2001. He won the National Film Award for Best Music Direction for the film Sringaram in 2006. In 2010, Jayaraman became a fellow of the Sangeet Natak Akademi.

Personal life
Lalgudi Jayaraman was married to Smt Rajalakshmi and had two children, son G.J.R.Krishnan and daughter Lalgudi Vijayalakshmi.  Both follow the footsteps of their father and are famous in their own right. Jayaraman had three sisters Padmavathy, a vainika, Rajalakshmi and Srimathi, both violinists. Srimathi learned violin from him as well. The renowned veena player Jayanthi Kumaresh is his sister Smt Rajalakshmi's daughter.

Jayaraman died on 22 April 2013 after suffering a cardiac arrest at his home in Chennai.

Compositions
Most famous for his thillanas and varnams, Sri Lalgudi Jayaraman is considered one of the most prolific composers of modern times.
His compositions span four languages (Tamil, Telugu, Kannada and Sanskrit), as well as a whole range of ragas not conventionally used for varnams or thillanas. Characteristic of his style, the melody of his compositions camouflages subtle rhythmic intricacies. His compositions are very popular with Bharathanatyam dancers, even as they have become a standard highlight of every leading Carnatic musician's repertoire.
His compositions include:

Varnams

Pada Varnams

Thillanas

Sri Lalgudi Jayaraman also tuned the Swathi Thirunal thillana 'Gitu Dhunika Taka Dhim' in Raga Dhanashree and set the compositions in its current form, which then went on to become hugely popular

Krithis

Apart from these compositions, Sri Lalgudi jayaraman has composed jathiswarams and swarajathis as well. The jathiswaram in Rasikapriya raga is popular among Bharatanatyam dancers. He has also composed a unique swarajathi which demonstrates the concept of Grahabhedam, using ragas Sindhu Bhairavi, Chenchurutti, Mohanakalyani, Behag and Tilang. He was a much sought after tunesmith who set tunes to numerous songs and compositions including several krithis of Ambujam Krishna.

References

External links
Official site of Sri Lalgudi Jayaraman

1930 births
2013 deaths
Carnatic violinists
Recipients of the Padma Shri in arts
Recipients of the Padma Bhushan in arts
Recipients of the Sangeet Natak Akademi Award
Recipients of the Sangeet Natak Akademi Fellowship
Tamil musicians
Carnatic composers
Tamil film score composers
Best Music Direction National Film Award winners
People from Tiruchirappalli district
20th-century violinists
20th-century Indian musicians